John McDougall (c. 1853 – 16 May 1925) was a Scottish footballer, who played for Scotland between 1877 and 1879. During his international career he played five matches, scoring four goals. He was the first player to score a hat-trick in an international game, scoring three goals for Scotland against England in a 7–2 win on 2 March 1878. During his domestic career he played for Vale of Leven.

International matches

See also
 List of Scotland national football team captains
 List of Scotland national football team hat-tricks

References

External links
Scotland stats at London Hearts Supporters Club

1853 births
1925 deaths
Scottish footballers
Scotland international footballers
Vale of Leven F.C. players
Association football forwards